The Bendigo Pioneers is an Australian rules football team in the statewide Victorian under-18s league, the NAB League.

Synopsis
The Bendigo Pioneers is an Australian rules football team playing in NAB League since 1993 based in Bendigo, Victoria, Australia. The idea behind the Bendigo Pioneers is to train its players and condition them for professional football. The team is divided into under-15s, under-16s, and under-18s. The Pioneers train at Epsom/Huntly Oval, Epsom. Their jersey colors are blue, white and yellow with blue, white and yellow socks and blue (home) or white (away) shorts. They are within the largest geographical region, from Bendigo to Broken Hill, therefore having the largest area to recruit from; but have been the least successful club in the competition, winning no premierships and finishing last on ten occasions as of 2021.

Notable players and coaches
Some notable players from the Bendigo Pioneers are record holders for most games played and most goals scored within the team, which are David Favelaiki and Stephen Reaper. Favelaiki played a record 49 games with the Pioneers, and Reaper scored 132 goals.

Honours
Runners-up (1): 2001
Wooden Spoons (10): 1993, 1994, 2005, 2006, 2010, 2011, 2014, 2015, 2017, 2018

Grand Finals

Draftees
Many notable players in the Australian Football League have been recruited from Bendigo. These players include: 
1993: Rowan Warfe, Ashley Thompson  
1994: N/A
1995: Nick Carter, Brent Frewen
1996: Nathan Brown, Damien Lock, Michael Braun 
1997: Mark Alvey, Matt Blake, Jordan Doering, Paul McMahon, Dean Solomon, Chris Tarrant, Nathan Thompson
1998: Michael O'Brien
1999: Brent Guerra, Kane Munro
2000: Daniel Harris, Luke Livingston, Josh Hunt, Callan Beasy  
2001: Nick Dal Santo, Daniel Elstone, Hugh Foott, Rick Ladson, Ashley Watson 
2002: Adam Selwood, Josh Thewlis, Troy Selwood 
2003: Andrew Walker, Colin Sylvia 
2004: N/A
2005: Travis Baird
2006: Joel Selwood, Daniel Connors, Andrew Collins
2007: Eljay Connors, Scott Selwood, Robbie Tarrant, Toby Thoolen
2008: N/A
2009: Dustin Martin, Jordan Williams
2010: Ariel Steinberg
2011: Sam Kerridge
2012: Jake Stringer, Ollie Wines 
2013: N/A
2014: Billy Evans, Jaden McGrath
2015: Tom Cole, Aidyn Johnson
2016: Joe Atley, Kobe Mutch, Kayle Kirby, Fergus Greene
2017: Paddy Dow, Lochie O'Brien, Jarrod Brander, Brent Daniels, Kane Farrell, Angus Schumacher, Derek Eggmolesse-Smith
2018: Jye Caldwell
2019: Brodie Kemp, Thomson Dow, Flynn Perez, Brady Rowles
2020: Seamus Mitchell, Josh Treacy, Jack Ginnivan, Will Shaw
2021: Cooper Hamilton

External links

Official Bendigo Pioneers website
Sporting Pulse summary

NAB League clubs
Sport in Bendigo
1993 establishments in Australia
NAB League Girls clubs
Australian rules football clubs established in 1993